The 1979–80 season was the fourth time Tennis Borussia Berlin played in the 2. Fußball-Bundesliga, the second highest tier of the German football league system. After 38 league games, Tennis Borussia finished 13th in the division, following an eleventh-placed finish the previous year. The club lost in the first round of the DFB-Pokal; going out 1–0 away to SC Viktoria 04 Köln. Norbert Stolzenburg scored 24 of the club's 57 league goals.

1979–80 Tennis Borussia Berlin squad

1979–80 fixtures

Player statistics

Final league position – 13th

References

External links 
 1979–80 Tennis Borussia Berlin season – squad and statistics at fussballdaten.de 

Tennis Borussia Berlin seasons
German football clubs 1979–80 season